Luyksgestel is a village in the Netherlands. It is located in the province of North Brabant, within the municipality of Bergeijk.

History
It was first mentioned in 1343 as Gastel, and means "guest house". Luik (French: Liège) has been added to distinguish from Moergestel.

For centuries, Luyksgestel was a part of the territories of the Southern Netherlands (present-day Belgium and surroundings). Until the French revolution it was an exclave of the Bishopric of Liège. Subsequently, until 1819, it belonged to the United kingdom of the Netherlands' province of Antwerp, and only then it was transferred to where it currently belongs: the province of North Brabant, in exchange for Lommel, a neighbouring Brabantian town that was put into the province of Limburg. Luyksgestel was a separate municipality until 1997, when it became part of the municipality Bergeijk.

Gallery

References

Municipalities of the Netherlands disestablished in 1997
Populated places in North Brabant
Former municipalities of North Brabant
Bergeijk